Gemmaterebra is an extinct genus of sea snails, marine gastropod mollusks in the family Terebridae, the auger snails.

Species
Species within the genus Gemmaterebra include:
 † Gemmaterebra bicorona (Hutton, 1885) 
 † Gemmaterebra catenifera Tate 1886.
 † Gemmaterebra subcatenifera Tate 1889

Distribution
The species of this genus were found in Tertiary strata in Australia

References

External links
 Bernard C. Cotton, Australian Recent and Tertiary Mollusca (Terebridae, Rissonidae, Fascillariidae, Volutidae); Transactions of the Royal Society of South Australia v. 75 (1952)
 Thomas A. Darragh, Catalogue of Australian Tertiary Mollusca (except chitons); Memoirs of the National Museum of Victoria vol. 31 (1970)

Terebridae